Nicolette Wessel (born 18 October 1959) is a Dutch rower. She competed in the women's quadruple sculls event at the 1988 Summer Olympics.

References

1959 births
Living people
Dutch female rowers
Olympic rowers of the Netherlands
Rowers at the 1988 Summer Olympics
Sportspeople from The Hague